William Hedges may refer to:
 William Hedges (Australian politician) (1856–1935), Australian politician
 William Hedges (New South Wales politician) (1881–1962), Australian politician
 William Hedges (colonial administrator) (1632–1701), English merchant and Governor of Bengal
 William S. Hedges (1860–1914), American surveyor and architect

See also 
 William Hedges-White, 3rd Earl of Bantry (1801–1884), Anglo-Irish peer